The Nakajima Ki-4  was  the last biplane reconnaissance aircraft of the Japanese Imperial Army. It saw combat service in Manchukuo and in north China during the early stages of the Second Sino-Japanese War.

Design and development
The Ki-4 was initially produced by Nakajima in response to a 1931 specification for a high-performance reconnaissance aircraft that could also be used in the light ground support role. After evaluating aircraft from Europe and the United States, the Imperial Japanese Army Air Force selected a new design by the domestic Nakajima Aircraft Company. The prototype was test flown in May 1934.

The Nakajima Ki-4 was a biplane design with staggered wings and fixed divided landing gear. It was powered by one  Nakajima Ha-8, nine-cylinder, air-cooled radial engine. It was armed with up to four 7.7 mm (.303 in) machine guns, two fixed to fire forward, synchronized with the propeller, and one or two more mounted dorsally on a flexible mount.

A total of 516 units were produced, 333 by Nakajima between March 1934 and February 1939, and 57 under license by Tachikawa Aircraft Company Ltd and another 126 by Manshū in Manchukuo (Manchuria).

Operational history
The first Ki-4s began equipping Imperial Japanese Army Air Force units in 1935 and were an active part of Japanese fighter squadrons for a number of years thereafter. The Ki-4s saw substantial service in the early stages of the Second Sino-Japanese War from 1938. They also functioned as light ground-attack aircraft in the support of advancing Japanese ground troops. However, these biplanes were vulnerable to even the oldest and slowest moving enemy fighters. By the time of the entry of Japan into World War II, the Ki-4s were regarded as obsolete. A number were still retained for use in the supply and liaison role from 1941, and others were transferred to the Manchukuo Air Force, but those that had not been lost in service served briefly as elementary trainers or target tugs before being scrapped. All of the Ki-4s were removed from active service by 1943.

Two Ki-4s were tested as seaplanes, one with twin floats and the other with one main and two stabilizing floats, but neither version was placed into production.

Variants
 Ki-4 (Army Type 94 Reconnaissance Aircraft)

Operators

 Imperial Japanese Army Air Force

 Manchukuo Air Force

Specifications (Ki-4)

See also

References
Notes

Bibliography

External links

 History of Nakajima Aircraft
 Operations Manual for Type 94 Reconnaissance Plane – National Diet Library

Ki-04, Nakajima
Ki-004
Single-engined tractor aircraft
Biplanes
Aircraft first flown in 1933